Snowfall is a form of precipitation.

Snowfall may also refer to:

Books and comics
 Snowfall, a 1994 romantic novel by K. M. Peyton
 Snowfall (comics), a fictional character in Marvel Comics 
 Snowfall Trilogy, a series of fantasy novels by Mitchell Smith, or the first novel in the series

Music
 Snowfall: The Tony Bennett Christmas Album, a 1968 album by Tony Bennett
 Snowfall (Yanni album), a 2000 compilation album
 Snowfall, a 2007 album by The Four Freshmen
 Snowfalls (album), debut solo album by Brian Keane 1986
 "Snowfall", a 1941 song written by Claude Thornhill
 "Snowfalls" (song), a song by t.A.T.u.
 "Snowfall", a 2008 song by God Is an Astronaut from their self-titled album

Other
 "Snow Fall", a 2012 multimedia narrative on a deadly avalanche in Washington State by The New York Times
 "Snow Falls" (Once Upon a Time), an episode of the TV series Once Upon a Time
 Snow Falls (film), a 2023 American horror film
 Snowfall, a 1974 Hungarian film directed by Ferenc Kósa
 Snowfall (TV series), an American television drama series
 Snowfall (horse), Thoroughbred racehorse

See also

 Northeast Snowfall Impact Scale
 List of Northeast Snowfall Impact Scale winter storms
 Snow (disambiguation)
 Fall (disambiguation)
 Snowstorm (disambiguation)